Dolicharthria grisealis is a moth in the family Crambidae. It was described by George Hampson in 1899. It is found on Socotra in Yemen.

References

Moths described in 1899
Spilomelinae
Endemic fauna of Socotra
Moths of Asia